Sycamore is an unincorporated community in Greene County, Pennsylvania, United States. Sycamore has a post office with ZIP code 15364, which opened on April 25, 1878.

William J. Ely (1911-2017), United States Army general and writer, was born in Sycamore.

References

Unincorporated communities in Greene County, Pennsylvania
Unincorporated communities in Pennsylvania